Jerónimo Carrión y Palacio (6 July 1804, Cariamanga – 5 May 1873) was President of Ecuador between 7 September 1865 and 6 November 1867. He also served as Vice President of Ecuador from 1858 to 1860. He was a member of the Ecuadorian Conservative Party.

Biography 

His presidency demonstrated remarkable honesty in its procedures and loyalty to the principles of the government. But he showed a lack of energy, which was abused by the adversaries of the current regime and those who still did not forgive the vigilance and severity of the previous one. The failure of this government in which any other era would have been a constructive government and of historical significance gave beginning in the contrast of characters between García Moreno and Jerónimo Carrión. The Minister of Government, assumed all the functions of the regime, to the extent that the whole country noticed the lack of will of the President, although it was not quite so. However, the administration was wise and developed in a climate of peace and relative tolerance.

References

 Official Website of the Ecuadorian Government about the country President's History

1804 births
1873 deaths
People from Loja Province
Ecuadorian people of Spanish descent
Conservative Party (Ecuador) politicians
Presidents of Ecuador
Vice presidents of Ecuador